Ugly Phil O'Neil (born Phillip Surridge on 14 March 1963) is a radio DJ/announcer. He was born in the United Kingdom, and lived the majority of his life in Australia. Before adopting the on-air name of Ugly Phil he was known on-air as Phil O'Neil. Phil has hosted the Hot30 Countdown, Drive at Nova 969, and Evenings at Triple M several times.

Phil also hosted a National Charts Show across the major and regional markets ("Ugly Phil's Hot Hits") previously known and currently known as The Hot Hits before and after his association with presenting the show. From December 2008 – June 2009, he was the co-host on the breakfast shift of Triple M Sydney with Sami Lukis.

Career

Radio

Early Years – The Hot30 Countdown
In 1993–94 he hosted a nightly program with his now ex-wife Jackie O (aka, Jackie Last) on Triple M Adelaide called "Phil O'Neil's Hot 30". Fox FM snapped him up later, where he and his wife moved their popular show onto Melbourne's airwaves where it was renamed the Hot 30 Countdown. When the Austereo network decided to syndicate the show nationally, Phil and Jackie O moved to Sydney, where the show was broadcast locally on 2Day FM and across the other 5 major Australian radio markets owned by Austereo, Fox FM Melbourne, SAFM Adelaide, B105 Brisbane, NXFM Newcastle, and FM 104.7 Canberra.

The Hot 30 would air between 7-10pm Monday to Friday. But on average the show go onto 10.30 pm, frustrating the host of the following shift, which was loved by Phil's listeners.
During the Hot 30 between 1998 and 2000 "Ugly Phil" would often call unaware late night shop attendants at petrol stations and convenience stores and random places, with prank calls. The pranks often entailed using an "Asian accent" ["you eat my dog... Why you eat my dog"] or he would call and the first thing he would say was ["Who are you?...Who are you?"]

Prior to his Hot 30 days, Phil worked at New FM in Newcastle.

Nova 969
After leaving Austereo he worked briefly in the United Kingdom for Kiss 100, before moving back to Australia to host drive on the newly launched Nova 969 in Sydney. Ugly Phil had the highest rating shift on Nova in the drive timeslot. Ugly Phil left this position around the end of 2002, citing management difficulties.

2003: Return to Austereo
In 2003, he signed onto evenings on the Triple M network – ditching the 'Ugly' name and opting for The Phil O'Neil Show. The program included interviews, prizes and lighthearted talkback – which was a first for the Triple M network. However, the experiment didn't pay off and Ugly Phil's contract was not renewed at the end of 2003 due to falling ratings and another overhaul of the network.

2004: Return to the UK
In 2004, it was announced he would front the breakfast shift on the newly licensed Kerrang Radio 105.2, in Birmingham, England with the Ugly put back onto the front of his name. This program was co-hosted by Rachel New. As of September 2007, Ugly Phil's Breakfast program has ceased, replacing his program with The Morning After starring Tim Shaw and Kate Lawler in the Breakfast shift. During the autumn of 2007, Phil could be heard covering at weekends on London's indie station XFM, leading to him fronting the weekday breakfast show over Christmas and New Year, filling in for Alex Zane.

July 2008: Triple M Nights
In July 2008 he returned to Australian airwaves hosting a night time show on Triple M Sydney once again. . When the show commenced on this date, it was given the 6 pm to 10 pm timeslot. The title for this program is Ugly Phil – It's A Rock Show.

December 2008 – June 2009: Triple M Sydney Breakfast
On 1 December 2008, Phil hosted the Breakfast shift on Triple M Sydney, with Sami Lukis however the show was cancelled in June 2009.

July 2009 to Present
After the two-week non-ratings period at the end of June 2009, the Ugly Phil and Sami breakfast show did not return. On 30 June 2009, O'Neil made a return to the weekday evenings time slot.

In October 2010, despite Ugly Phil winning the ACRA award, Austereo did not renew Ugly Phil's contract for 2011 and shifted a new show called The Sweetest Plum to the night time slot on Sydney and Melbourne's Triple M.

In December 2010, 96fm Perth announced that Ugly Phil would be co-hosting their breakfast program with Brad Fitzgerald from January 2011. In October 2012, Ugly Phil joined Central Coast's Star 104.5FM to be a part of drive time with the station.

In 2014, Ugly Phil joined Triple M Brisbane followed by moving on to do mornings on Triple M Sydney.

On 12 October 2015 Ugly Phil moved over to do The Rubber Room on Triple M.

In 2019, Phil returned to the UK to present the breakfast show on Fix Radio.

2020 has seen Phil standing as guest presenter on the afternoon show on Planet Rock.  July 2020, Phil returned to Australia and filled in on WSFM. From 23 November 2020 Phil permanently took over the weekday 9am-1pm slot on WSFM.

Awards and nominations
He was announced as Commercial Radio's Best Music Personality in 2000.

Other media
He appeared briefly on the Network 10 produced program Ground Zero (1997–1999) co-hosted by Jade Gatt, Penne Dennison and Jackie O. He also appeared on SBS's Pizza series.

He made a cameo appearance as a radio DJ in the Australian movie Occasional Coarse Language (1998).

References

http://www.news.com.au/dailytelegraph/story/0,22049,24026838-5006002,00.html

1963 births
Living people
Australian radio personalities
British radio personalities
British emigrants to Australia